The , officially the , is a Japanese funicular line in Kōya, Wakayama, operated by Nankai Electric Railway. The line opened in 1930 as a route to Mount Kōya, a famous Buddhist spot.

In 2019, the line was upgraded to use the modern Nankai 10-20 Series cars.

Basic data

Distance: 
System: Single track with two cars and passing loop
Gauge: 
Stations: 2
Vertical interval:

Stations

See also
List of funicular railways
List of railway lines in Japan

Funicular railways in Japan
Rail transport in Wakayama Prefecture
Cable Line
Railway lines opened in 1930
1067 mm gauge railways in Japan
1930 establishments in Japan